Bothriomyrmex meridionalis is a species of ant in the genus Bothriomyrmex. Described by Roger in 1863, the species is widespread in various European countries and also in Africa, including Algeria, Bulgaria, Croatia, France, Georgia, Montenegro, Romania, Slovakia and Spain.

References

Bothriomyrmex
Hymenoptera of Europe
Hymenoptera of Africa
Insects described in 1863
Taxa named by Julius Roger